Edgar Taylor (1886–1979) was a notable New Zealand horticulturist and landscape architect. He was born in London,  England in 1886.

References

1886 births
1979 deaths
English emigrants to New Zealand
New Zealand horticulturists
New Zealand landscape architects